The Old Ship is a public house in Aveley, Essex, in England. It is on the Campaign for Real Ale's National Inventory of Historic Pub Interiors.

References

National Inventory Pubs
Pubs in Essex
Aveley